"Radioactive Man" is the second episode of the seventh season of the American animated television series The Simpsons. It originally aired on the Fox network in the United States on September 24, 1995. In the episode, the film version of the comic book series Radioactive Man is shot in Springfield. Much to Bart's disappointment, the part of the hero's sidekick, Fallout Boy, goes to Milhouse. When he tires of the long hours required to shoot the film, Milhouse quits the role, forcing the filmmakers to cease production and return to Hollywood.

The episode was written by John Swartzwelder and directed by Susie Dietter. Mickey Rooney guest starred as himself in the episode. "Radioactive Man" was the first episode of The Simpsons to be digitally colored. The episode features cultural references to the 1960s Batman television series, the 1995 film Waterworld, and the song "Lean on Me" by Bill Withers.

Since airing, the episode has received positive reviews from fans and television critics. It acquired a Nielsen rating of 9.5, and was the fourth-highest-rated show on the Fox network that week.

Plot
Bart and Milhouse are thrilled to learn a film version of their favorite comic book series, Radioactive Man, is being produced in Springfield. Several Springfield Elementary students audition for the role of Fallout Boy when tryouts are held at their school. After Bart is rejected for being an inch too short, Milhouse is cast as Fallout Boy opposite Rainier Wolfcastle as Radioactive Man. When Milhouse's parents hear their son will play Fallout Boy, they buy expensive products because they expect to "start living in the fast lane" now that their son is a Hollywood movie star.

Disappointed at losing the role, Bart remains Milhouse's friend and confidant. Milhouse sours on the long hours and multiple takes required to shoot the film, and disappears during filming of the most expensive scene. Production is suspended while the townspeople search for Milhouse. Bart finds him in his treehouse, where former child star Mickey Rooney unsuccessfully tries to convince Milhouse to finish the film. Deeming Rooney an unsuitable replacement for Milhouse, the bankrupt producers cancel the film and return to Hollywood, where they are greeted with open arms.

Production

The episode was written by John Swartzwelder, and directed by Susie Dietter. When Dietter read through his first script, she did not find it very funny because of all the visual gags. Once the animatic was finished, she thought: "Hey, this is really funny!"

This is the first episode of The Simpsons to be digitally colored. The duties of that task went to USAnimation, who would later work on "The Simpsons 138th Episode Spectacular". Digital coloring would not be attempted again until season 12's "Tennis the Menace", and again in season 14's "Treehouse of Horror XIII". The show permanently switched to digital coloring later in that same season, beginning with "The Great Louse Detective".

Mickey Rooney guest starred as himself in the episode. Nancy Cartwright recalls in her autobiography My Life as a 10-Year-Old Boy that Rooney recorded his lines with the other actors. Although he was late for the session, she comments that he was "so full of pep" and very enthusiastic about the role.

Cultural references

The Radioactive Man character is based on Batman, and several scenes in the episode reference the Batman television series from the 1960s. A Radioactive Man antagonist, The Scoutmaster, is based on actor/comedian Paul Lynde. The scene in the new Radioactive Man film where Radioactive Man and Fallout Boy are captured in Aquaworld is a reference to the 1995 film Waterworld. The director of the Radioactive Man film says: "That Milhouse is going to be big, Gabby Hayes big!", in reference to the (not all that big) American actor Gabby Hayes. Moe Szyslak, the bartender of Moe's Tavern, says that he, as a kid, played the part of Smelly on The Little Rascals, until he killed Alfalfa for stealing his schtick. Bill Withers' song "Lean on Me" from 1972 is played at the end of the episode.

In one scene, Comic Book Guy sends a message to other Internet nerds about who will star in the new Radioactive Man film, two of whom are the nerds Homer met in "Homer Goes to College", and one is Prince dressed in a purple suit. The last nerd is Curtis Armstrong, with an appearance resembling his Revenge of the Nerds character Booger. The usenet newsgroup which he posts the message to (alt.nerd.obsessive) is a reference to the alt.tv.simpsons newsgroup.

Reception
In its original broadcast, "Radioactive Man" finished 51st in the ratings for the week of September 18 to September 24, 1995. It acquired a Nielsen rating of 9.5. The episode was the fourth-highest-rated show on the Fox network that week, following The X-Files, Beverly Hills, 90210, and Melrose Place.

Since airing, the episode has received mostly positive reviews from fans and television critics.

The authors of the book I Can't Believe It's a Bigger and Better Updated Unofficial Simpsons Guide, Warren Martyn and Adrian Wood, called the episode a "wonderful pastiche" on the Tim Burton Batman films, and added that Milhouse is an obvious candidate for Fallout Boy.

DVD Movie Guide's Colin Jacobson enjoyed the episode, but he does not consider it a "classic". He said that it offers "more than a few amusing bits", and added that "spoofing the movie business isn't anything new, but the show does it well in this solid program".

Jennifer Malkowski of DVD Verdict considered the best part of the episode to be when Krusty tries to prove the "range" of different characters he can portray to the casting director. The website concluded its review by giving the episode a grade of A−.

Nancy Basile of About.com named it one of her twenty favorite episodes of the series, and said that she thinks the friendship between Bart and Milhouse in the episode is "endearing" and "touching". She added that she thinks the episode "pokes fun at Hollywood very effectively", and that "To top it off, funny favorite characters Rainier Wolfcastle [...] and Lionel Hutz are also in the episode."

Graham Beckwith of The Lantern singled out Rainier Wolfcastle's line "My eyes! The goggles do nothing!" from the episode as one of The Simpsons "greatest one liners".

Total Films Nathan Ditum ranked Rooney's performance as the eighth-best guest appearance in the show's history, commenting that he is "desperately funny and self-effacing as a parody of his fallen child-star self."

References

Bibliography

External links

"Radioactive Man" episode capsule at The Simpsons Archive

The Simpsons (season 7) episodes
1995 American television episodes
Superhero fiction
Fictional films
Parody superheroes
Hollywood, Los Angeles in fiction
Television shows written by John Swartzwelder
Television episodes about filmmaking
Television episodes about comics